Vitrea pygmaea is a species of gastropods belonging to the family Pristilomatidae.

The species inhabits terrestrial environments.

References

Pristilomatidae